Autopass (stylized autoPASS) is an electronic toll collection system used in Norway. It allows collecting road tolls automatically from cars. It uses electronic radio transmitters and receivers operating at 5.8 GHz (MD5885) originally supplied by the Norwegian companies Q-Free and Fenrits. Since 2013 Kapsch and Norbit supplied the transponders. In 2016 the Norwegian Public Roads Administration revealed that they had chosen Norbit and Q-Free as suppliers of Autopass-transponders the next four years.

With an AutoPASS contract it is also possible to use the tag in Denmark and Sweden on ferries and bridges through the EasyGo partnership. In December 2021, the Norwegian Public Roads Administration withdrew from EasyGo starting a transition period until 31 March 2022. AutoPASS providers need to be EETS-registered and approved by the operators in order for the OBE to be valid in those toll facilities after the transition period ends.

In 2019 more and more ferry crossings are also using Autopass as a payment option through the "AutoPass for ferry" concept. A few crossings are automatic, but most are still manual. If you have a tag you pay only for the vehicle at fully automatic crossings with a 10% discount. If you apply for an Autopass ferry account, which is prepaid, you get a 50%(40% corporate) discount for vehicle, and 17% for passengers at manual payment crossings. See https://www.autopassferje.no for more information.

Technology

The system involves the installation of a DSRC based radio transponder on the windscreen of a vehicle, and to sign an agreement with one of the toll collection companies in Norway. The system is administrated by the Norwegian Public Roads Administration. All public toll roads now use the electronic toll collection system.

Each Autopass unit contains a microcontroller which will process requests from the road side, and respond with the proper information to the road side.

There are 5 generations of cryptographic key pairs inside each Autopass unit, which are unique for each unit.  The cryptographic keys are used for authenticating the unit when passing a toll plaza, thus making it difficult to make fraudulent copies of an Autopass unit.  Unlike similar DSRC based tolling systems used in many countries, there is no access control in the Norwegian system, the unique ID within the unit being available for those who have the proper DSRC equipment.

There is an internal storage space for 100 log entries, which are normally updated each time a vehicle owner is charged when passing a toll plaza. This is a collection of receipt entries which includes the time, date, and the station identity of the toll plaza which did the tolling transaction.

Each Autopass unit features a move detect mechanism. When the unit is removed from the windscreen, an electrical switch will be activated, causing a flag to be set in a processor within the Autopass unit. This flag will be registered when doing a tolling transaction the next time the unit passes a toll plaza.

Obligatory tag for heavy vehicles
The provision has its legal basis in regulations that were adopted on 10 October 2014. It applies to all above-mentioned Norwegian and foreign vehicles on the entire public road network. Failure to carry a toll payment tag will result in a fine of 8,000 NOK. Failure to pay within three weeks means that the penalty charge will be increased to 12,000 NOK. If you are stopped twice without a tag within a period of two years, you will be fined 16,000 NOK.

Supporting toll plazas

Toll rings

Oslo and Akershus
Kristiansand 
Nord-Jæren
Haugalandet
Bergen
Askøy
Namsos
Bodø
Harstad
Grenland
Førde
Trondheim

Public roads

E6 Helgeland nord
E6 Helgeland sør
E6 Trondheim–Stjørdal
E6 Tingberg
E6 Svinesund Bridge 
E6 Moss
E6 Raukerud, Østfoldpakka
E6 Gardermoen-Moelv, Akershus
E6 Frya-Sjoa, Oppland
E6 Hålogaland Bridge
E6/E10 Trældal - Leirvik, Nordland
E16 Bolstad, Hordaland
E16 Kongsvinger-Slomarka, Hedmark
E16 Fønhus-Bagn, Oppland
E18 Østfoldpakka, Østfold
E18 Vestfold (Gulli-Sky)
E39 Handeland, Vest-Agder
E134 Stordalstunnelen, Åkrafjorden, Hordaland 
E136 Tresfjord Bridge and Vågstrand Tunnel, Møre og Romsdal
Rv4 Lunner grense, Oppland
Rv 7 Sokna-Ørgenvika, Buskerud
Rv13 Hardanger Bridge, Hordaland
Rv13 Svelgane, Hordaland
Rv36 Ullevik, Telemark
Rv 80 Nordland
Fv7 Kvammapakken, Hordaland
Fv16 Lunner grense, Oppland
Fv 17 Tverlandet - Godøystraumen, Nordland
Fv 33 Langsletta, Oppland
Fv 34 Grime, Oppland
Fv43 Kollevoll
Fv45 Gjesdal, Rogaland
Fv47 T-Link, Rogaland
Fv78 Vegpakke Helgeland, Nordland
Fv107 Jondal Tunnel
Fv108 Kråkerøyforbindelsen, Østfold
Fv118 The old Svinesund Bridge 
Fv128 Østfoldpakka
Fv163 Around Tresfjorden, Møre og Romsdal
Fv175 Kongsvinger-Slomarka, Hedmark
Fv250 Kongsvinger-Slomarka, Hedmark
Fv255 Gausdalsvegen, Oppland
Fv311 Kambo, Østfoldpakka, Østfold
Fv312 Frya-Sjoa
Fv312 Skarsmoen, Oppland
Fv315 Lundgård, Gausdalsvegen, Oppland
Fv465 Gjervollstad, Vest-Agder
Fv519 Finnøytunnelen
Fv542 Bømlopakken, Hordaland
Fv544 Halsnøysambandet, Hordaland
Fv714 Laksevegen
Fv 715 Krinsvatn
Fv858 Rya Tunnel

Former
Tønsberg Toll Ring 
E6 Grillstad–Værnes
E6 Trondheim – Stjørdal
E16 Hadelandsvegen
E18 Buskerud
E18 Vestfold Nord
E18 Agder
E39 Rennesøy Fixed Link
E39 Triangle Link
E39 Øysand–Thamshavn
E134 Oslofjord Tunnel
Rv4 Oppland
Rv 9 Setesdal
Rv19 Skoppum, Horten, Vestfold
Rv55 Fatla tunnel
Fv71 Sykkylven Bridge
Fv108 Hvaler Tunnel
Fv551 Folgefonna tunnel
Fv562 Askøy Bridge
Fv566 Osterøy Bridge
Fv661 Straumsbrua

See also
 Toll roads in Norway
 Dedicated Short Range Communications

External links
 English version of Official site
 More information about Autopass

References

Road transport in Norway
Electronic toll collection
Toll roads in Norway